Gerry Davis may refer to:

Gerry Davis (umpire) (born 1953), Major League baseball umpire
Gerry Davis (outfielder) (born 1958), Major League baseball outfielder
Gerry Davis (screenwriter) (1930–1991), British writer for television and film

See also
Gerald Davis (disambiguation)
Jerome Davis (disambiguation)
Jerry Davis (disambiguation)
Gerard Davis (born 1977), footballer
Jeremiah Davis (1826–1910), American politician
Jeremy Davis (born 1985), musician